The Sound and the Fury is the fifth album by British singer-songwriter Nerina Pallot. It was released on 11 September 2015, four years since her last studio album Year of the Wolf. The first release from the album was the teaser track "The Road". The first official single, a re-recording of "Rosseau" from Pallot's 12 EP set The Year of the EPs, was released alongside The Sound and the Fury on 11 September 2015.

Background and recording
In 2014, Pallot spent 12 months recording 12 EPs of five songs in a project she titled The Year of the EPs. Following fan feedback and critical response, the best tracks were selected, alongside the recording of three new songs to be reworked to form a new studio album.

Reception

Uncut gave The Sound and the Fury 7/10, stating the songs on the album "leave a lasting impression".

Track listing

Charts

References

2015 albums
Nerina Pallot albums